The creamy-rumped miner (Geositta isabellina) is a species of bird in the family Furnariidae. It is found in Argentina and Chile. Its natural habitat is subtropical or tropical high-altitude grassland.

References

Geositta
Birds of Argentina
Birds of Chile
Birds described in 1864
Taxa named by Christian Ludwig Landbeck
Taxonomy articles created by Polbot